An accident is an unintended, normally unwanted event that was not directly caused by humans.  The term accident implies that nobody should be blamed, but the event may have been caused by unrecognized or unaddressed risks.  Most researchers who study unintentional injury avoid using the term accident and focus on factors that increase risk of severe injury and that reduce injury incidence and severity.  For example, when a tree falls down during a wind storm, its fall may not have been caused by humans, but the tree's type, size, health, location, or improper maintenance may have contributed to the result.  Most car wrecks are not true accidents; however English speakers started using that word in the mid-20th century as a result of media manipulation by the US automobile industry.

Types

Physical and non-physical
Physical examples of accidents include unintended motor vehicle collisions, falls, being injured by touching something sharp or hot, or bumping into something while walking. 

Non-physical examples are unintentionally revealing a secret or otherwise saying something incorrectly, accidental deletion of data, or forgetting an appointment.

Accidents by activity
 Accidents during the execution of work or arising out of it are called work accidents. According to the International Labour Organization (ILO), more than 337 million accidents happen on the job each year, resulting, together with occupational diseases, in more than 2.3 million deaths annually.
 In contrast, leisure-related accidents are mainly sports injuries.

Accidents by vehicle

Vehicle collisions are not usually accidents; they are mostly caused by preventable causes such as drunk driving and intentionally driving too fast.  The use of the word accident to describe car wrecks was promoted by the US National Automobile Chamber of Commerce in the middle of the 20th century, as a way to make vehicle-related deaths and injuries seem like an unavoidable matter of fate, rather than a problem that could be addressed.  The automobile industry accomplished this by writing customized articles as a free service for newspapers that used the industry's preferred language.  Since 1994, the US National Highway Traffic Safety Administration has asked media and the public to not use the word accident to describe vehicle collisions.
 Aviation
 Bicycles
 Sailing ships
 Traffic collisions
 Train wrecks
 Trams

Domino effect accidents
In the process industry, a primary accident may propagate to nearby units, resulting in a chain of accidents, which is called domino effect accident.

Common causes

Poisons, vehicle collisions and falls are the most common causes of fatal injuries. According to a 2005 survey of injuries sustained at home, which used data from the National Vital Statistics System of the United States National Center for Health Statistics, falls, poisoning, and fire/burn injuries are the most common causes of death.

The United States also collects statistically valid injury data (sampled from 100 hospitals) through the National Electronic Injury Surveillance System administered by the Consumer Product Safety Commission. This program was revised in 2000 to include all injuries rather than just injuries involving products. Data on emergency department visits is also collected through the National Health Interview Survey. In The U.S. the Bureau of Labor Statistics has available on their website extensive statistics on workplace accidents.

Accident models

Many models to characterize and analyze accidents have been proposed, which can be classified by type.  No single model is the sole correct approach. Notable types and models include:
 Sequential models
 Domino Theory
 Loss Causation Model
 Complex linear models
 Energy Damage Model
 Time sequence models
 Generalized Time Sequence Model
 Accident Evolution and Barrier Function
 Epidemiological models
 Gordon 1949
 Onward Mappings Model based on Resident Pathogens Metaphor
 Process model
 Benner 1975
 Systemic models
 Rasmussen
 Reason Model of System Safety (embedding the Swiss cheese model)
 Healthcare error proliferation model
 Human reliability
 Woods, 1994
 Non-linear models
 System accident
 Systems-Theoretic Accident Model and Process (STAMP)
 Functional Resonance Analysis Method (FRAM)
 Assertions that all existing models are insufficient

Ishikawa diagrams are sometimes used to illustrate root-cause analysis and five whys discussions.

See also

General
 Accident analysis
 Root cause analysis
 Accident-proneness
 Idiot-proof
 Injury
 Injury prevention
 List of accidents and disasters by death toll
 Safety
 Safety engineering
 Fail-safe
 Poka-yoke
 Risk management

Transportation
 Air safety
 Aviation accidents and incidents
 Bicycle safety
 Car
 Automobile safety
 Traffic collision
 List of rail accidents
 Tram accident
 Sailing ship accidents

Other specific topics
 Aisles: Safety and regulatory considerations
 Explosives safety
 Nuclear and radiation accidents
 Occupational safety and health
 Safety data sheet
 Personal protective equipment
 Criticality accident
 Sports injury

References

External links 

 
Failure